"Nautilus" is the sixth and final track on the 1974 album, One, by the jazz musician Bob James.

Background and recording
The title comes from producer Creed Taylor remarking that the tones were reminiscent of the sounds of a submerging submarine. It is featured in Grand Theft Auto: San Andreas on the fictional Master Sounds 98.3 FM radio station. It is said to be one of the most sampled tracks in hip hop and is found in at least 352 songs.

Personnel
 Bob James (keyboards)
 Gary King (bass)
 Idris Muhammad (drums)

References

American jazz songs
1974 songs